Ijaw may refer to:
Ijaw people
Ijaw languages

Language and nationality disambiguation pages